Michael Bruce Eisen (born April 13, 1967) is an American computational biologist and the editor-in-chief of the journal eLife. He is a professor of genetics, genomics and development at University of California, Berkeley. He is a leading advocate of open access scientific publishing and is co-founder of Public Library of Science (PLOS). In 2018, Eisen announced his candidacy U.S. Senate from California as an Independent, though he failed to qualify for the ballot.

Early life and education

Born in Boston, Eisen and his brother Jonathan were raised in a family of scientists. Their grandfather was an x-ray crystallographer, their father, Howard Eisen a physician, and mother, Laura a biochemist. They moved to Bethesda, Maryland when Eisen was four or five years old. The brothers spent summers in Long Island with their grandparents. Eisen states that he loved frogs and salamanders '"Even more than I have a frog fetish, I have a swamp fetish. I really like being in swamps."'  He was also very interested in math and was captain of the high school math team. Eisen graduated from Walt Whitman High School in 1985. Intending to major in mathematics at Harvard University, he realized that there [he may encounter] other more brilliant math students, it was a Good Will Hunting moment and he decided that he did not want to major in mathematics, '"You don't want to be Salieri to Mozart."' During his years at Harvard, Eisen worked on "unlocking the three-dimensional structures of proteins." He was shown a DNA microarray which taught him a '"new way of doing biology"'.

Eisen completed his PhD at Harvard University in biophysics and a B.S. (also from Harvard) in Math.  He was under the supervision of Don Craig Wiley while studying Influenza A virus Proteins.

After earning his doctorate, Eisen was a Postdoctoral Fellow at Stanford University in the lab of David Botstein, where he most notably developed a method for interpreting gene expression data from microarrays. The seminal research publication that Eisen authored about this project has been cited over 16,000 times.

Baseball and biology 

When Eisen lived in Tennessee he worked as a play-by-play announcer for a minor league baseball team, the Columbia Mules. He is  a self-proclaimed Red Sox fanatic. He and computational biologist James Fraser recorded a video for iBiology about the role baseball statistics influenced their research. Their argument is that sequencing DNA is similar to scoring a baseball game, and that many computational biologists learned to think about science computations from an obsessive interest in baseball stats. The exercise of comparing a specific player's stats to a database of other similar players allows a baseball fan to predict future performance. This same system works with proteins and predicting functions. As tools are developed that break down and track all stats concerning baseball players, so will technology improve with genetics. With both baseball and genetics, tools are being developed that refine the models.  In a lecture in 2015, Eisen stated that he received a computer from his grandfather for his twelfth birthday and spent the next five years teaching himself how to program so that he could keep track of baseball stats.

Research
His academic research focuses on the evolution of gene regulation. Despite this focus, Eisen's work has historically spanned very diverse disciplines. For example, his 5 most cited papers  cover a broad range of topics including methods for hierarchical clustering, applications to human breast cancers (with David Botstein and Charles Perou), and discovery of tumor subtypes in diffuse large B cell lymphoma (with Ash Alizadeh and Louis Staudt). His more recent research work has been on fruit flies and Drosophila and how they "develop from a tiny single-celled egg to a mature adult. He says they hold insights into what goes wrong in people as they age." He receives funding from the Howard Hughes Medical Institute for his research.

2018 U.S. Senate race

Eisen announced through Twitter on January 25 his intent to run for U.S. Senate from California in 2018 for Democratic Senator Dianne Feinstein's seat, registering the Twitter handle SenatorPhD. His campaign slogan was "Liberty, Equality, Reality". Eisen's reasons for running for Congress included his perception that the Trump administration was unresponsive to climate change and other science-related issues. Another reason Eisen decided to run was his experience watching Cabinet appointees being interviewed by the Senate about climate change. He thought '“It would be really nice to have scientists ask the questions of the Cabinet appointees, because the senators don’t seem to understand the issue and aren’t asking the right questions.”' He feels that if science is to be on the forefront of policy making, '"scientists need to run for office."' He felt that 2018's California jungle primaries afforded him a better chance at making the final two for the general election, but he did not make the final two (which were Dianne Feinstein and Kevin de León).

Eisen dropped out of the race when he failed to qualify for the June 2018 primary ballot.

Open Access advocacy
Throughout his career he has been an advocate for "open science", which is the free release of the material and intellectual product of scientific research. He is a leading advocate of open access scientific publishing and is co-founder of Public Library of Science (PLOS) and serves on the PLOS board, the Academic Steering & Advocacy Committee of Open Library of Humanities, and is an adviser to Science Commons.

In 2012 Eisen began protesting against the Research Works Act as part of his appeal to promote open access to information.

Awards and honors
In 2002, Eisen was awarded the inaugural Benjamin Franklin Award in bioinformatics, for his work on PLOS and the open-access availability of his microarray cluster analysis software.

References

External links
It is NOT junk - Personal blog of Michael Eisen
Open letter to President Trump to replace Francis Collins as NIH Director
Michael Eisen (I) for Senate

1967 births
Living people
21st-century American biologists
American bioinformaticians
Harvard College alumni
University of California, Berkeley faculty
Howard Hughes Medical Investigators
Founders
PLOS people
American scientists
Harvard Graduate School of Arts and Sciences alumni
Candidates in the 2018 United States Senate elections
Walt Whitman High School (Maryland) alumni